The Ha! van Humo is a yearly award offered since 1980 by the Flemish magazine Humo to the best television show of the year. The winner, chosen from 10 nominees, receives 5,000 Euro and a sculpted "H". In the first years, the show has also been given a few times to a TV maker and to a radio show instead of a television show. In 1997 and 2014 there were 2 winners, in 2012 no award was presented.

Palmares

Notes

Belgian television awards
Awards established in 1980
1980 establishments in Belgium